Arthur William "Skinny" Graham Jr. (August 12, 1909 – July 10, 1967) was an American professional baseball player whose nine-season career included 21 games played as an outfielder and pinch hitter for the – Boston Red Sox. He batted left-handed and threw right-handed.

Graham graduated from Bridgton Academy in Maine. Baseball Reference lists his pro career as beginning at age 24 in 1934 in the Red Sox' farm system with Reading of the New York–Pennsylvania League; a Society for American Baseball Research biography, however, dates his pro career to earlier in the 1930s in lower-level minor leagues. After hitting .331 in 1934 with 51 extra-base hits at Reading, he was promoted to Boston, batting .234 with 11 hits in 13 September games. He spent most of 1935 in the minors, returning to the Red Sox late in the season and hitting .300 (three for ten) in limited service.

All told, in 21 MLB games, he collected 14 hits, with two doubles, one triple, four runs batted in and three stolen bases. In 1936, Graham returned to the minor leagues for the rest of his pro career.

He died in Cambridge, Massachusetts, at 57 in July 1967. One of his sons, Arthur III, played professional football for the Boston Patriots of the AFL from 1963 through 1968.

References

External links 

1909 births
1967 deaths
Baltimore Orioles (IL) players
Baseball players from Massachusetts
Boston Red Sox players
Elmira Pioneers players
Indianapolis Indians players
Little Rock Travelers players
Major League Baseball outfielders
Memphis Chickasaws players
Reading Red Sox players
St. Paul Saints (AA) players
Sportspeople from Somerville, Massachusetts
Syracuse Chiefs players
Attleboro Burros players